The transmitter Le Mans-Mayet is a 342-metre-high guyed mast for TV- and FM-radio transmission near Le Mans, France at 0°19'E and 47°45'N. This guyed mast, built in 1993, is one of the tallest constructions of France, taller than Eiffel Tower.

See also
 Mayet
 List of masts

References

External links
 
 http://perso.wanadoo.fr/tvignaud/galerie/tv-fm/72lemans-mayet.htm
 http://www.skyscraperpage.com/diagrams/?b45905

Radio masts and towers in Europe
Buildings and structures in Sarthe
Towers in France
Transmitter sites in France
1993 establishments in France
Towers completed in 1993